Pietro Martino (born 4 August 1997) is an Italian football player. He plays for  club Cosenza.

Club career
Martino spent the first six seasons of his senior career in the fourth-tier Serie D before joining Foggia in Serie C in July 2021.

On 7 July 2022, Martino signed with Serie B club Cosenza. He made his Serie B debut for Cosenza on 14 August 2022 in a game against Benevento.

References

External links
 

1997 births
Sportspeople from Modena
Living people
Italian footballers
Association football defenders
U.S. Sassuolo Calcio players
F.C. Legnago Salus players
F.C. Arzignano Valchiampo players
Clodiense S.S.D. players
Calcio Foggia 1920 players
Cosenza Calcio players
Serie D players
Serie C players
Serie B players